Wayne Community School District or Wayne Community Schools (WCS) is a rural public school district headquartered in Corydon, Iowa. It operates Wayne Elementary School and Wayne Junior/Senior High School.

The district is mostly in Wayne County with small sections in Decatur and Lucas counties. Communities in its service area include: Corydon, Allerton, Clio, Lineville, and Millerton.

History
In 1959, the Cambria and Corydon school districts merged to form the Cambria–Corydon Community School District. The Wayne Community School District was formed in 1966 with the merger of the Cambria–Corydon Community School District with the Millerton School District and the former Allerton School District that had for a time been a part of the Allerton–Clio–Lineville (ACL) District. ACL then became the Lineville–Clio Community School District. After the 2008 dissolution of the Russell Community School District, the district absorbed some of the former students of the Russell district. The Lineville–Clio Community School District merged into Wayne on July 1, 2011.

Schools
 Wayne Elementary School
 Wayne Junior/Senior High School

Wayne Junior/Senior High School

Athletics
The Falcons compete in the Pride of Iowa Conference in the following sports:

 Football
 Volleyball
 Cross Country
 Basketball
 Wrestling
 Golf
 Track and Field
 Baseball
 Softball

See also
List of school districts in Iowa
List of high schools in Iowa

References

External links
 Wayne Community School District
 

School districts in Iowa
Education in Wayne County, Iowa
Education in Decatur County, Iowa
Education in Lucas County, Iowa
1966 establishments in Iowa
School districts established in 1966